Mill Island is an ice-domed island,  long and  wide, lying  north of the Bunger Hills. Mill Island was discovered in February 1936 by personnel on the William Scoresby, and named for British geographer and meteorologist Hugh Robert Mill.

See also
 Composite Antarctic Gazetteer
 List of Antarctic and sub-Antarctic islands
 List of Antarctic islands south of 60° S
 SCAR
 Territorial claims in Antarctica

References

External links

Islands of Queen Mary Land